Below is a series of timelines of LGBT Mormon history consisting of events, publications, and speeches about LGBTQ+ individuals, topics around sexual orientation and gender minorities, and the community of members of the Church of Jesus Christ of Latter-day Saints (LDS Church). Although the historical record is often scarce, evidence points to queer individuals having existed in the Mormon community since its beginnings and to leaders being against homosexual sexual behavior. LDS leadership started to more regularly address topics regarding the LGBT community in public in the late 1950s. Since 1970, the LDS Church has had at least one official publication or speech from a high-ranking leader referencing LGBT topics every year, and a greater number of LGBT Mormon and former Mormon individuals have received media coverage.

The timeline is divided into the following parts for readability. Each part is linked below:

 LGBT Mormon history in the 1800s
 LGBT Mormon history in the 1900s to 1940s
 LGBT Mormon history in the 1950s
 LGBT Mormon history in the 1960s
 LGBT Mormon history in the 1970s
 LGBT Mormon history in the 1980s
 LGBT Mormon history in the 1990s
 LGBT Mormon history in the 2000s
 LGBT Mormon history in the 2010s
 LGBT Mormon history in the 2020s

See also

 Homosexuality and The Church of Jesus Christ of Latter-day Saints
 Law of adoption (Mormonism)
 LGBT rights in Utah
 LGBT Mormon suicides
 List of Christian denominational positions on homosexuality
 Mormonism in the 19th century
 Mormonism in the 20th century
 Mormonism in the 21st century
 Sexuality and Mormonism
 Utah Constitutional Amendment 3

References

LGBT and Mormonism
LGBT history in the United States
Timelines of Christianity
History of the Latter Day Saint movement
LGBT timelines